Lyon-Dalberg-Acton may refer to:
John Lyon-Dalberg-Acton (disambiguation), several people
Richard Lyon-Dalberg-Acton (disambiguation), several people

See also
Dalberg (disambiguation)
Acton (surname)
Lyon (surname)
Dalberg-Acton

Compound surnames
Surnames of English origin
Surnames of German origin